Hultgreen is a surname. Notable people with the surname include:

Dagny Hultgreen (born 1962), America film actress and entertainment reporter
Finn Sture Hultgreen (born 1949), Norwegian politician
Kara Hultgreen (1965–1994), United States naval aviator

See also
 Hultgren